The Book of the Anchorite of Llanddewibrefi (also Jesus ms. 119) (Welsh: Llyfr Ancr Llanddewibrefi or Llyfr yr Ancr) is a fourteenth-century Welsh manuscript. It contains a collection of religious texts translated from Latin to Welsh, chief among them the Elucidarium, as well as Historia Lucidar, Ymborth yr Enaid, Breuddwyd Pawl and the Prester John text Ystorya Gwlat Ieuan Vendigeit. It is dated in a colophon to Historia Lucidar to the year 1346. The scribe identifies himself as an anchorite, but remains otherwise anonymous. He also states in the manuscript that it was commissioned by Gruffydd ap Llywelyn ap Phylip ap Trahaearn of Cantref Mawr in Carmarthenshire. At the end of the seventeenth or beginning of the eighteenth century, it was given to Jesus College, Oxford, and is currently housed in the Bodleian Library in Oxford.

Bibliography
Thomas Jones, 'The Book of the Anchorite of Llanddewi Brefi', Transactions and Archaeological Record, Cardiganshire Antiquarian Society, 12 (1937), 63–82
Sarah Rowles, 'Yr Elucidarium: Iaith, strwythur, cynnwys ac arwyddocâd y cyfieithiadau Cymraeg', PhD dissertation, Aberystwyth University, 2008.

External links
 Text
 Digital facsimile version, Bodleian Library

References 

1340s books
Welsh manuscripts
Medieval Welsh literature
Bodleian Library collection
Jesus College, Oxford